Hyblaea ibidias is a moth in the family Hyblaeidae. It is found in New South Wales, Australia.

The larvae have been recorded feeding on Pandorea jasminoides.

Synonyms
Hyblaea joiceyi is listed as a synonym of this species by the Australian Faunal Directory, but is listed as a full species by The Global Lepidoptera Names Index. The Global Lepidoptera Names Index lists Hyblaea cruenta as a synonym of H. joiceyi.

References

Moths described in 1902
Hyblaeidae